José de Guzmán Benítez (1857 – 28 October 1923) was Mayor of Ponce, Puerto Rico, from 28 February 1901 until 1902. José de Guzmán Benítez is best known for the launching of his 1899 manifesto to the people of Puerto Rico for the creation of a pro-American political party.

Early years
Guzmán Benítez was born in 1857 to Manuel De Guzman and Modesta Benitez. He married Carmen Soto Rodriguez, from Sabana Grande, Puerto Rico, with whom he had a son named Jose Ignacio (1884–1941).

Mayoral term

Guzmán Benítez, along with his chief of police Rodulfo Figueroa were regarded by the Federal Party as "highly controversial" figures due to their association with members of Ponce's lower class. The Republican side of Ponce's Municipal Assembly, meanwhile, demanded Guzmán Benítez's resignation but a crowd of Ponce residents, numbering some two thousand, took over the halls of the Assembly building, coming to Guzmán Benítez's defense.

A caricature was made of De Guzmán Benítez of his 1900 election win that is well preserved. The 1900 election was significant in that it was the first election since the United States invaded the Island in 1898.

With the arrival of the Americans in Puerto Rico in 1898, De Guzmán Benítez proposed the creation of a pro-American political party. The proposal caught the attention of Jose Celso Barbosa, leader of the Partido Ortodoxo de Puerto Rico (Orthodox Party of Puerto Rico). Celso Barbosa held a party assembly in San Juan to which De Guzmán Benítez was invited. The 4 July 1899 assembly resulted in the creation of the Partido Republicano de Puerto Rico (Republican Party of Puerto Rico).

Death
De Guzmán Benítez died in San Juan, Puerto Rico, on 28 October 1923, as a result of a cardiac arrest, more specifically an asystole. He was 67 years old.

References

Notes

See also

 List of Puerto Ricans
 List of mayors of Ponce, Puerto Rico

Further reading
 Fay Fowlie de Flores. Ponce, Perla del Sur: Una Bibliográfica Anotada. Second Edition. 1997. Ponce, Puerto Rico: Universidad de Puerto Rico en Ponce. pp. 319-320. Item 1603. 
 "Las ultimas elecciones en Puerto Rico: el gobierno americano protegiendo a los ladrones de voto." Puerto Rico Herald. 27 Noviembre 1902. pp. 295-298.
 Fay Fowlie de Flores. Ponce, Perla del Sur: Una Bibliográfica Anotada. Second Edition. 1997. Ponce, Puerto Rico: Universidad de Puerto Rico en Ponce. p. 109. Item 560. 
 The Representative Men of Puerto Rico. Compiled and edited by F.E. Jackson & Son. C. Frederiksen, artist and photographer. s.l.: F.E. Jackson & Son. 1901. (PUCPR; Universidad Puerto Rico - Rio Piedras, UPR).
 Fay Fowlie de Flores. Ponce, Perla del Sur: Una Bibliográfica Anotada. Second Edition. 1997. Ponce, Puerto Rico: Universidad de Puerto Rico en Ponce. p. 116. Item 589. 
 Felix Bernier Matos. Cromos ponceños. (por Fray Justo) Ponce, Puerto Rico: Imprenta "La Libertad." 1896. (Colegio Universitario Tecnológico de Ponce, CUTPO)
 Fay Fowlie de Flores. Ponce, Perla del Sur: Una Bibliografía Anotada. Segunda Edición. 1997. Ponce, Puerto Rico: Universidad de Puerto Rico en Ponce. p. 339. Item 1687. 
 Jose G. del Valle. "A través de diez años (1897-1907): trabajos políticos, económicos, históricos y sociales.''  Barcelona, España:  Establecimiento Tipográfico de Feliú y Susanna. 1907. (Pontificia Universidad Católica de Ponce.)

Mayors of Ponce, Puerto Rico
1857 births
1923 deaths